Belz-Ploemel (French: Gare de Belz-Ploemel) is a railway station in Ploemel, Brittany, France. The station was opened on 24 July 1882, and is located at kilometric point (KP) 591.577 on the Auray–Quiberon railway. The station also serves the town of Belz. The station is served by TER Bretagne services operated by the SNCF, between Auray and Quiberon (summer only).

Gallery

References

External links
 Auray-Quiberon timetable

TER Bretagne
Railway stations in France opened in 1882
Railway stations in Morbihan